Mehrgarh is a Neolithic archaeological site (dated ) situated on the Kacchi Plain of Balochistan in Pakistan. It is located near the Bolan Pass, to the west of the Indus River and between the modern-day Pakistani cities of Quetta, Kalat and Sibi. The site was discovered in 1974 by an archaeological team led by the French archaeologists Jean-François Jarrige and his wife, Catherine Jarrige. Mehrgarh was excavated continuously between 1974 and 1986, and again from 1997 to 2000. Archaeological material has been found in six mounds, and about 32,000 artifacts have been collected from the site. The earliest settlement at Mehrgarh—located in the northeast corner of the  site—was a small farming village dated between 7000 BCE and 5500 BCE.

History

Mehrgarh is the earliest known site in Pakistan showing evidence of farming and herding. It was influenced by the Neolithic culture of the Near East, with similarities between "domesticated wheat varieties, early phases of farming, pottery, other archaeological artefacts, some domesticated plants and herd animals." According to Asko Parpola , the culture migrated into the Indus Valley and became the Indus Valley Civilization of the Bronze Age.

Jean-Francois Jarrige argues for an independent origin of Mehrgarh. Jarrige notes "the assumption that farming economy was introduced full-fledged from Near-East to South Asia," and the similarities between Neolithic sites from eastern Mesopotamia and the western Indus Valley, which are evidence of a "cultural continuum" between those sites. However, given the originality of Mehrgarh, Jarrige concludes that Mehrgarh has an earlier local background," and is not a "'backwater' of the Neolithic culture of the Near East."

Lukacs and Hemphill suggest an initial local development of Mehrgarh, with continuity in cultural development but a population change. According to Lukacs and Hemphill, while there is a strong continuity between the Neolithic and Chalcolithic cultures of Mehrgarh, dental evidence shows that the Chalcolithic population did not descend from the Neolithic population of Mehrgarh, which "suggests moderate levels of gene flow." They wrote that "the direct lineal descendants of the Neolithic inhabitants of Mehrgarh are to be found to the south and the east of Mehrgarh, Pakistan in northwestern India and the western edge of the Deccan Plateau," with Neolithic Mehrgarh showing greater affinity with Chalcolithic Inamgaon, south of Mehrgarh, than with Chalcolithic Mehrgarh. 

Gallego Romero et al. (2011) state that their research on lactose tolerance in India suggests that "the west Eurasian genetic contribution identified by Reich et al. (2009) principally reflects gene flow from Pakistan, Iran and the Middle East." Gallego Romero notes that Indians who are lactose-tolerant show a genetic pattern regarding this tolerance which is "characteristic of the common European mutation." According to Romero, this suggests that "the most common lactose tolerance mutation made a two-way migration out of the Middle East less than 10,000 years ago. While the mutation spread across Europe, another explorer must have brought the mutation eastward to India – likely traveling along the coast of the Persian Gulf where other pockets of the same mutation have been found." They further note that "[t]he earliest evidence of cattle herding in south Asia comes from the Indus River Valley site of Mehrgarh and is dated to 7,000 YBP."

Periods of occupation
Archaeologists divide the occupation at the site into eight periods.

Mehrgarh Period I (pre-7000 BCE–5500 BCE) 
The Mehrgarh Period I (pre-7000 BCE – 5500 BCE) was Neolithic and aceramic (without the use of pottery). The earliest farming in the area was developed by semi-nomadic people using plants such as wheat and barley and animals such as sheep, goats and cattle. The settlement was established with unbaked mud-brick buildings and most of them had four internal subdivisions. Numerous burials have been found, many with elaborate goods such as baskets, stone and bone tools, beads, bangles, pendants, and occasionally animal sacrifices, with more goods left with burials of males. Ornaments of sea shell, limestone, turquoise, lapis lazuli and sandstone have been found, along with simple figurines of women and animals. Seashells from far seashores, and lapis lazuli from as far away as present-day Badakshan, show good contact with those areas. One ground stone axe was discovered in a burial, and several more were obtained from the surface. These ground stone axes are the earliest to come from a stratified context in South Asia.

Periods I, II, and III are considered contemporaneous with another site called Kili Gul Mohammad. The aceramic Neolithic phase in the region had originally been called the 'Kili Gul Muhammad phase'. While the Kili Gul Muhammad site, itself, probably started c. 5500 BC, the subsequent discoveries now allow to define the dates of 7000-5000 BC for this aceramic Neolithic phase.

In 2001, archaeologists studying the remains of nine men from Mehrgarh discovered that the people of this civilization knew proto-dentistry. In April 2006, it was announced in the scientific journal Nature that the oldest (and first early Neolithic) evidence for the drilling of human teeth in vivo (i.e. in a living person) was found in Mehrgarh. According to the authors, their discoveries point to a tradition of proto-dentistry in the early farming cultures of that region. "Here we describe eleven drilled molar crowns from nine adults discovered in a Neolithic graveyard in Pakistan that dates from 7,500 to 9,000 years ago. These findings provide evidence for a long tradition of a type of proto-dentistry in early farming culture."

Mehrgarh Period II (5500 BCE–4800 BCE) and Period III (4800 BCE–3500 BCE)
The Mehrgarh Period II (5500 BCE–4800 BCE) and Merhgarh Period III (4800 BCE–3500 BCE) were ceramic Neolithic, using pottery, and later chalcolithic. Period II is at site MR4 and Period III is at MR2. Much evidence of manufacturing activity has been found and more advanced techniques were used. Glazed faience beads were produced and terracotta figurines became more detailed. Figurines of females were decorated with paint and had diverse hairstyles and ornaments. Two flexed burials were found in Period II with a red ochre cover on the body. The number of burial goods decreased over time, becoming limited to ornaments and with more goods left with burials of females. The first button seals were produced from terracotta and bone and had geometric designs. Technologies included stone and copper drills, updraft kilns, large pit kilns, and copper melting crucibles. There is further evidence of long-distance trade in Period II: important as an indication of this is the discovery of several beads of lapis lazuli, once again from Badakshan. Mehrgarh Periods II and III are also contemporaneous with an expansion of the settled populations of the borderlands at the western edge of South Asia, including the establishment of settlements like Rana Ghundai, Sheri Khan Tarakai, Sarai Kala, Jalilpur, and Ghaligai.

Period III was not much explored, but it was found that Togau phase (c. 4000-3500 BCE) was part of this level, covering around 100 hectares in the areas MR.2, MR.4, MR.5 and MR.6, encompassing ruins, burial and dumping grounds, but archaeologist Jean-François Jarrige concluded that "such wide extension was not due to contemporaneous occupation, but rather due to the shift and partial superimposition in time of several villages or settlement clusters across a span of several centuries."

Togau phase 
At the beginning of Mehrgarh III, Togau ceramics appeared at the site. Togau ware was first defined by Beatrice de Cardi in 1948. Togau is a large mound in the Chhappar Valley of Sarawan, 12 kilometer northwest of Kalat in Baluchistan. This type of pottery is found widely in Baluchistan and eastern Afghanistan, at sites such as Mundigak, Sheri Khan Tarakai, and Periano Ghundai. According to Possehl it is attested at 84 sites up to date. Anjira is a contemporary ancient site near Togau.

Togau ceramics is decorated with geometric designs and was already made by using a potter's wheel.

The time in Mehrgarh Period III, during the second half of the 4th millennium BCE, is characterized by important new developments. There's a big increase in the number of settlements in the Quetta Valley, the Surab Region, the Kachhi Plain and elsewhere in the area. Kili Ghul Mohammad (II−III) pottery is similar to Togau Ware.

Mehrgarh Periods IV, V and VI (3500 BCE–3000 BCE) 
Period IV was 3500 to 3250 BCE. Period V from 3250 to 3000 BCE and period VI was around 3000 BCE. The site containing Periods IV to VII is designated as MR1.

Mehrgarh Period VII (2600 BCE–2000 BCE) 
Somewhere between 2600 BCE and 2000 BCE, the city seems to have been largely abandoned in favor of the larger and fortified town Nausharo five miles away when the Indus Valley civilisation was in its middle stages of development. Historian Michael Wood suggests this took place around 2500 BCE.

Archaeologist Massimo Vidale considers a series of semi-columns found in a structure at Mehrgarh, dated around 2500 BCE by the French mission there, is very similar to semi-columns found in Period IV at Shahr-i Sokhta.

Mehrgarh Period VIII
The last period is found at the Sibri cemetery, about 8 kilometers from Mehrgarh.

Lifestyle and technology
Early Mehrgarh residents lived in mud brick houses, stored their grain in granaries, fashioned tools with local copper ore, and lined their large basket containers with bitumen. They cultivated six-row barley, einkorn and emmer wheat, jujubes and dates, and herded sheep, goats and cattle. Residents of the later period (5500 BCE to 2600 BCE) put much effort into crafts, including flint knapping, tanning, bead production, and metal working. Mehrgarh is probably the earliest known center of agriculture in South Asia.

The oldest known example of the lost-wax technique comes from a 6,000-year-old wheel-shaped copper amulet found at Mehrgarh. The amulet was made from unalloyed copper, an unusual innovation that was later abandoned.

Artifacts

Human figurines
The oldest ceramic figurines in South Asia were found at Mehrgarh. They occur in all phases of the settlement and were prevalent even before pottery appears. The earliest figurines are quite simple and do not show intricate features. However, they grow in sophistication with time, and by 4000  BC begins to show their characteristic hairstyles and typical prominent breasts. All the figurines up to this period were female. Male figurines appear only from period VII and gradually become more numerous. Many of the female figurines are holding babies, and were interpreted as depictions of the "mother goddess". However, due to some difficulties in conclusively identifying these figurines with the "mother goddess", some scholars prefer using the term "female figurines with likely cultic significance".

Pottery

Evidence of pottery begins from Period II. In period III, the finds become much more abundant as the potter's wheel is introduced, and they show more intricate designs and also animal motifs. The characteristic female figurines appear beginning in Period IV and the finds show more intricate designs and sophistication. Pipal leaf designs are used in decoration from Period VI. Some sophisticated firing techniques were used from Periods VI and VII and an area reserved for the pottery industry has been found at mound MR1. However, by Period VIII, the quality and intricacy of designs seem to have suffered due to mass production, and a growing interest in bronze and copper vessels.

Burials
There are two types of burials in the Mehrgarh site. There were individual burials where a single individual was enclosed in narrow mud walls and collective burials with thin mud-brick walls within which skeletons of six different individuals were discovered. The bodies in the collective burials were kept in a flexed position and were laid east to west. Child bones were found in large jars or urn burials (4000~3300 BCE).

Metallurgy
Metal finds have dated as early as Period IIB, with a few copper items.

See also

Indus Valley civilisation and the list of Indus Valley civilisation sites
List of inventions and discoveries of the Indus Valley civilisation
Sanitation of the Indus Valley civilisation
Bhirrana
Mundigak — archaeological site in Kandahar Province
Hadda — archaeological site in Nangarhar Province
Surkh Kotal — archaeological site in Baghlan Province
Mes Aynak — archaeological site in Logar Province
Sheri Khan Tarakai — archaeological site in Bannu
Mohenjo-daro — archaeological site in Sindh
Harappa — archaeological site in Punjab
Bolan Pass
Nausharo
Chanhudaro
Quetta
List of Stone Age art

Notes

References

Sources

Further reading
 Mehrgarh
 
 Jarrige, Jean-Franois, Mehrgarh Neolithic 
 Jarrige, C, J. F. Jarrige, R. H. Meadow, G. Quivron, eds (1995/6), Mehrgarh Field Reports 1974-85: From Neolithic times to the Indus Civilization.
 Jarrige J. F., Lechevallier M., Les fouilles de Mehrgarh, Pakistan : problèmes chronologiques [Excavations at Mehrgarh, Pakistan: chronological problems] (French).
 Lechevallier M., L'Industrie lithique de Mehrgarh (Pakistan) [The Lithic industry of Mehrgarh (Pakistan)] (French)
 
 Santoni, Marielle, Sabri and the South Cemetery of Mehrgarh: Third Millennium Connections between the Northern Kachi Plain (Pakistan) and Central Asia
 Lukacs, J. R., Dental Morphology and Odontometrics of Early Agriculturalists from Neolithic Mehrgarh, Pakistan
 Barthelemy De Saizieu B., Le Cimetière néolithique de Mehrgarh (Balouchistan pakistanais) : apport de l'analyse factorielle [The Neolithic cemetery of Mehrgarh (Balochistan Pakistan): Contribution of a factor analysis] (French).

Indus Valley Civilization

South Asia
 
 
 
 

South Asia paleoanthropology

Central Asia

Global history

 India
 Avari, Burjor, India: The Ancient Past: A history of the Indian sub-continent from c. 7000  BC to AD 1200, Routledge.
 Singh, Upinder, A History of Ancient and Early Medieval India: From the Stone Age to the 12th century, Dorling Kindersley, 2008, 
 Lallanji Gopal, V. C. Srivastava, History of Agriculture in India, up to c. 1200 AD.
 
 

 Indo-Aryans

External links

 Archaeological Site of Mehrgarh, UNESCO
 Mehrgarh Neolithic  by Jean-François Jarrige

Populated places established in the 7th millennium BC
1974 archaeological discoveries
Archaeological cultures in India
History of South Asia
Indus Valley civilisation sites
History of Balochistan
Neolithic settlements
Pre-Indus Valley civilisation sites
Former populated places in Pakistan
Quetta District
Archaeological sites in Balochistan, Pakistan